Pietro Priuli (1669–1728) was a Roman Catholic cardinal.

Biography
On 1 Jul 1708, he was consecrated bishop by Pope Clement XI, with Bandino Panciatici, Cardinal-Priest of San Pancrazio, and Ferdinando d'Adda, Cardinal-Priest of Santa Balbina, serving as co-consecrators.

Episcopal succession
While bishop, he was the principal consecrator of:
Doymus Zeni, Bishop of Arbe (1720);
Valerio Rota, Bishop of Belluno (1720); and
Antoine Kacich, Bishop of Trogir (1721).

References

1669 births
1728 deaths
16th-century Italian cardinals
18th-century Roman Catholic bishops in the Republic of Venice